Hans von Speyer was a 15th-century German scribe. He was probably born near Speyer, Germany in the mid-15th century. In c. 1491, he produced the MS M.I.29, a fencing manual compiling several significant treatises from the tradition of Johannes Liechtenauer.

In c. 1455, a Hans von Speyer assisted in the creation of the typeface for Johannes Gutenberg's 42-Line Bible, but this may or may not be the same scribe.

External links 
 Transcription and translation of his fechtbuch by Hammaborg
 Speyer on Wikitenauer.com

Sources 
 Transcription and translation of his fechtbuch
 MS M.I.29 - Universitätsbibliothek, Salzburg, Austria

15th-century German people
Year of death unknown
German scribes
Year of birth unknown
German male writers
Medieval European scribes